Alan Main (born 1936) is a retired minister of the Church of Scotland.

Life
He was born in Aberdeen in 1936. He was educated at Robert Gordon's College then studied divinity at Aberdeen University from 1954. In 1960 he travelled to the US to study at the Union Theological Seminary in New York.

He was ordained in 1963 and served as minister at Chapel of Garioch Parish Church, Aberdeenshire, 1963–1970 and was then appointed as chaplain to the University of Aberdeen.

He was professor of practical theology at the University of Aberdeen, 1980–2001, and was also master of Christ's College, Aberdeen, 1992–2001. He has served as minister in Colombo, Sri Lanka.

He was elected Moderator of the General Assembly of the Church of Scotland for the year 1998/1999. His formal title (following the end of his Moderatorial year) is the Very Reverend Professor Alan Main.

From 2000 to 2013 he was patron of the Seven Incorporated Trades of Aberdeen.

He was president of the Boys' Brigade 2006–2007.

See also
List of Moderators of the General Assembly of the Church of Scotland

References

Clergy from Aberdeen
People educated at Robert Gordon's College
Alumni of the University of Aberdeen
Academics of the University of Aberdeen
Moderators of the General Assembly of the Church of Scotland
20th-century Ministers of the Church of Scotland
Living people
1936 births
21st-century Ministers of the Church of Scotland